{{Self reference|For instructions on how to archive a talk page, see Help:Archiving a talk page
archive is a collection of historical records.

Archive, The Archive, or Archives may also refer to:

Companies
 Archive Corporation, a data storage company active in the 1980s
 The Internet Archive, a large digital library
 The Wayback Machine, an archive of the World Wide Web created by the Internet Archive

Computing
 Archive bit, a file system attribute used for controlling incremental backups
 Archive file, a computer file combining several files into one
 Archive site, a website that stores information from the World Wide Web
 Web archiving, the process of archiving the World Wide Web

Internet
 archive.is, a general purpose archive site
 arXiv (pronounced "archive"), an online archive of scientific papers

Publishing
 Archive (non-profit publishing organisation), a publishing and research platform based in Berlin
 Archive (magazine), a membership computer magazine for users of the Acorn Archimedes and RISC OS
 Archives, a scholarly journal of the British Records Association
 The Archive a defunct scholarly journal of the Center for Creative Photography

Music
 Archive (band), a trip-hop/progressive rock band
 Grand Archives, an indie rock band formerly known as Archives

Albums
 Archive (The Specials album), 2001
 Archive (Magnum album), 1993
 Archives (Darkest Hour album), 2006
 The Archive (EP), a 2013 EP by Imagine Dragons
 Archives, a 1978 box set by Rush

Film
 Archive (film), a 2020 science fiction film directed by Gavin Rothery

Other uses
 Archives station, a Washington Metro station

See also
 List of national archives
 Cache (disambiguation)
 Hoarding (disambiguation)